"Where the Action Is" is a pop song written by Harry Vanda and George Young. It was recorded by Australian pop singer John Paul Young. The song was released in October 1977 as the lead single from Young's first compilation album, All the Best (1977). The song peaked at number 33 on the Kent Music Report.

Track listing 
7" (AP 11562) 
Side A "Where the Action Is" (H. Vanda and G. Young) - 3:04
Side B "Down on My Knees" (J. P. Young, Warren Morgan) - 3:28

Charts

References 

1977 songs
1977 singles
John Paul Young songs
Songs written by Harry Vanda
Songs written by George Young (rock musician)
Song recordings produced by Harry Vanda
Song recordings produced by George Young (rock musician)
Albert Productions singles